Espionage in Tangier is a 1965 Spanish-Italian spy film, inspired by James Bond and directed by Gregg C. Tallas.

Cast
Luis Dávila	as Mike Murphy / Agent S 077
José Greci		as Lea
Perla Cristal		as Madeleine
Ana Castor		as Madame Stanier
Alfonso Rojas		as Prof. Grave
Alberto Dalbés		as Rigo Orel
Tomás Blanco
Barta Barry
Alberto Cevenini
Amparo Díaz
Juan Cafinos
Rafael Vaquero

References

External links
 

1965 films
1960s spy thriller films
Spanish spy thriller films
1960s Spanish-language films
Italian spy thriller films
1960s action films
Films set in Tangier
Films scored by Benedetto Ghiglia
Films directed by Gregg G. Tallas
1960s Italian films
1960s Spanish films